Markos Nino (born 3 November 2002) is a Greek professional footballer who plays as a midfielder for Super League 2 club AEL.

References

2002 births
Living people
Greek people of Albanian descent
Albanian footballers
Albanian expatriate footballers
Super League Greece 2 players
Gamma Ethniki players
Panionios F.C. players
Athlitiki Enosi Larissa F.C. players
Albanian expatriate sportspeople in Greece
Expatriate footballers in Greece
Association football midfielders
Footballers from Athens
Greek footballers